The Railway Employes' Department (RED) was a semi-autonomous department of the AFL–CIO.

History
The department was founded in 1908, as the Railroad Employes' Department, and was chartered by the American Federation of Labor in February 1909.  In 1915, it became the "Railway Employes' Department", and it continued to use the old spelling of employees throughout its existence.  By 1925, the department had nine affiliates:

 Brotherhood of Maintenance of Way Employees
 Brotherhood of Railway Carmen
 International Association of Machinists
 International Brotherhood of Blacksmiths, Drop Forgers, and Helpers
 International Brotherhood of Boilermakers, Iron Shipbuilders, and Helpers
 International Brotherhood of Electrical Workers
 International Brotherhood of Stationery Firemen and Oilers
 Sheet Metal Workers' International Association
 Switchmen's Union of North America

In 1926, the Railway Labor Executives' Association was founded, a broader organization within which the president of the RED had a single vote.

In 1955, the department became part of the new AFL-CIO.  It was dissolved in 1980.  In 1990, a new Transportation Trades Department was founded.

Presidents
1908: Henry B. Perham
1912: Arthur O. Wharton
1922: Bert M. Jewell
1946: Fred N. Aten
1951: Michael Fox
1970: James E. Yost

References

Railway labor unions
Trade unions established in 1908
Trade unions disestablished in 1980